The Judo competition in the 2001 Summer Universiade were held in Beijing, People's Republic of China from 23 August to 26 August 2001.

Medal overview

Men's event

Women's event

Results overview

Men

60 kg

66 kg

73 kg

81 kg

90 kg

100 kg

+100 kg

Open class

Women

48 kg

52 kg

57 kg

63 kg

70 kg

78 kg

+78 kg

Open class

Medals table

External links
 
 FISU Webcasting 21st Summer Universiade 2001 Beijing

2001 Summer Universiade
Universiade
2001
Judo competitions in China